Jedidiah Solomon ben Abraham Norzi (1560–1626) was a Rabbi and exegete, best known for his work Minchat Shai.

Born at Mantua, he studied under Moses Cases, and received his rabbinical ordination in 1585. Toward the beginning of the 17th century he was elected co-rabbi of Mantua, a position which he held until his death.

Masoretic Labors 

Jedidiah Solomon consecrated the greater part of his life to a critical and Masoretic commentary on the Bible, which was considered a standard work. The author spared no pains to render his critical labors as complete as possible, and to leave the Biblical text in as perfect a condition as thorough learning and conscientious industry could make it. He noted all the various readings which are scattered through Talmudic and midrashic literatures, and consulted all the Masoretic works, both published and unpublished.

To collate all the manuscripts to which he could gain access, and to find the Masoretic work Masoret Seyag la-Torah of Meïr ben Todros Abulafia, Jedidiah Solomon undertook extended voyages and lived for a long time abroad. Among the manuscripts consulted by him was that of Toledo of the year 1277 (now known as the Codex De Rossi, No. 782). He compared all the texts of the printed editions and availed himself of his friend Menahem di Lonzano's critical labors in connection with biblical orthography. Lonzano's seminal work on the Pentateuch, Or Torah, was a primary source of inspiration for Norzi, from which he gleaned most of his knowledge of scribal practices and of masoretic works unavailable to him.

The work was completed in 1626 and was entitled by its author Goder Peretz, but given the title Minḥat Shai when the work was first printed by its publisher, Raphael Ḥayyim Basila, more than 100 years later, who added to it some notes and appended a list of 900 variations (Mantua, 1742–44). It was divided into two volumes, the first embracing the Pentateuch and the Five Megillot, and the second comprising the Hagiographa and the Prophets, with two small treatises at the end—Ma'amar haMa'arikh, on the Meteg, and Kelale BeGaDKaFaT, on the six Hebrew letters that can receive a dagesh kal and the Ḳameẓ ḥaṭuf. A second edition, without the grammatical treatises, appeared at Vienna in 1816; the commentary on the Pentateuch alone, with the Hebrew text, was published at Dubrovna in 1804; the commentary on the Hagiographa and the Prophets, at Wilna in 1820. Jedidiah Solomon's introduction was published by Samuel Vita della Volta in 1819, and republished by A. Jellinek at Vienna in 1876. A commentary on the Minḥat Shai was published by Ḥayyim Zeeb Bender of Babruisk under the title Or Ḥayyim (Wilna, 1867).

Norzi was greatly influenced by the Spanish biblical scholar, Rabbi Meïr Ha-Levi, who is cited by him more than six-hundred times in Minḥat Shai.

MSS of Minḥat Shai
 MS Oxford, Bodleian Library (Oxford 1886), Mich. 562
 idem, Mich. 478
 MS Kaufman A43 (Library of the Hungarian Academy of Sciences, Budapest, Hungary)
 MS Kaufman A44 (Library of the Hungarian Academy of Sciences, Budapest, Hungary)
 MS London, British Museum, Add. 27198 
 MS Parma 895 (Codex Parm. 2872), the Palatina Library

Secondary literature
Betzer, Zvi. H. 2001. Further clarifications on the work of Norzi. Hebrew Studies 42:257-269.

References

Bibliography

Giovanni Bernardo De Rossi, Dizionario, p. 250;
Eichhorn, Einleitung in das Alte Testament;
Rosenmüller, Handbuch für die Literatur der Biblischen Exegesis;
Steinschneider, Cat. Bodl. col. 2377;
Fürst, Bibl. Jud. iii.39;
Michael, Or ha-Ḥayyim, p. 432, No. 951;
Fuenn, Keneset Yisrael, p. 382.

1560 births
1626 deaths
17th-century Italian rabbis
Rabbis from Mantua
16th-century Italian rabbis
Grammarians of Hebrew